Kingstree station is a train station in Kingstree, South Carolina, operated by Amtrak, the United States' railroad passenger system. It was originally built by the Atlantic Coast Line Railroad in 1909. The station survived the merger of the Atlantic Coast Line and Seaboard Air Line Railroads into the Seaboard Coast Line Railroad in 1967, only to terminate passenger service in 1971. Amtrak service to Kingstree began on June 15, 1976, with the introduction of the Palmetto. The station is currently part of the Kingstree Historic District.

The two tracks at Kingstree station cross the intersection of East Main Street (SC 261) and Hampton Avenue. Four streets named "Railroad Avenue" run along the tracks near the station. South Railroad Avenue on the west side of the tracks is on the corner of the station house itself, while South Railroad Avenue on the east side of the tracks is a dead end street running south of Ashton Avenue. On the north side of East Main Street, North Railroad Avenue on the west side of the tracks begins at Hampton Avenue just north of its southern terminus with East Main Street, while North Railroad Avenue on the east side begins at East Main Street itself.

References

External links

Kingstree Amtrak Station (USA Rail Guide -- Train Web)
Kingstree, South Carolina Railroad Stations (South Carolina Railroad Stations)

Amtrak stations in South Carolina
Atlantic Coast Line Railroad stations
Buildings and structures in Williamsburg County, South Carolina
Transportation in Williamsburg County, South Carolina
Historic district contributing properties in South Carolina
Railway stations in the United States opened in 1909
National Register of Historic Places in Williamsburg County, South Carolina
Railway stations on the National Register of Historic Places in South Carolina